Serita D. Frey is an American academic and ecologist, who serves as Professor of Environmental Science at the University of New Hampshire. Her research considers how human activities impact terrestrial ecosystems.

Early life and education 
Frey studied ecology at Colorado State University. She was awarded a Colorado State Francis Clark Soil Biology Scholarship to study agricultural management practices and how they influence soil microorganisms. She moved to the University of Virginia for doctoral research, where she studied relationships between strains of rhizobium leguminosarum biovar phaseoli.

Research and career 
Frey studies how anthropogenic stressors impact terrestrial ecosystems. She is particularly interested in soil biota (the composition of soil microbial communities) and nutrient cycling. Frey studies how humans have impacted climate change, invasive species and nitrogen deposition, and how this impacts soil and nutrients. She has conducted experiments at the Harvard Forest Long-term Ecological Research site.

Frey is one of the most highly cited ecologists in the world. She serves as Editor-in-Chief of Issues in Ecology.

Awards and honors 
 2011 University of New Hampshire Outstanding Associate Professor Award
 2020 Elected Fellow of the American Association for the Advancement of Science
 2020 Elected Fellow of the Ecological Society of America

Selected publications

References 

Living people
20th-century American women educators
20th-century American educators
21st-century American women educators
21st-century American educators
American ecologists
American women academics
American women environmentalists
American women scientists
Colorado State University alumni
Human ecologists
University of New Hampshire faculty
University of Virginia alumni
Year of birth missing (living people)